Leknes Airport is a regional airport serving the town of Leknes and the surrounding areas in the Lofoten archipelago in Nordland county, Norway.  The airport is located just outside Leknes in Vestvågøy municipality.  The European route E10 highway passes along the east side of the airport. In 2014, Leknes Airport had 101,757 passengers. It is operated by Avinor.

Service
The airport is served by Widerøe with Dash 8 aircraft connecting the community to Bodø and other communities in Nordland. The routes are operated on public service obligation with the Norwegian Ministry of Transportation and Communication. Flights to Oslo via Bodø take about 3 hours with connecting routes Widerøe/Scandinavian Airlines.

Airlines and destinations

Statistics

Ground transportation
There are no buses, but taxis are available.

Future
Avinor is planning building a new primary airport to serve Lofoten and possibly also Vesterålen. The region wants to be more attractive on the conference market which would create more job opportunities outside the tourist season, and there is a need to adopt airports to modern aircraft types.

Two locations have been put forward, Gimsøya and Hadselsanden.  The former could replace Leknes Airport and Svolvær Airport, the latter could also replace Stokmarknes Airport. As both alternatives imply direct services to Oslo, the leakage to Evenes would be reduced. However weather recordings has shown that Gimsøy, located at the big ocean, is too windy and foggy for an airport.

Therefore, the main option now is to extend the runway and terminal of Leknes airport, considering that Svolvær airport has no room for runway extension. No such project is part of the Norwegian National Transport Plan for 2022–2033.

References

Airports in Nordland
Airports in the Arctic
Avinor airports
Vestvågøy
1972 establishments in Norway
Airports established in 1972